Mirak is a village in the Alagyaz Municipality of the Aragatsotn Province of Armenia. The town's 5th-century church is in ruins.

References 

Populated places in Aragatsotn Province
Yazidi populated places in Armenia